John Harrison was an English representative in Morocco in the 17th century.

James I of England sent John Harrison to Muley Zaydan in Morocco in 1610 and again in 1613 and 1615 in order to obtain the release of English captives. He negotiated a treaty in May 1627 with Sidi al-Ayachi, independent governor of Salé,  who had risen a month before against Mulay Zaydan.

Harrison published an account of the Sultan Mulay Abd al-Malik in 1633.

Works
Late Newes out of Barbary (London: Arthur Jonson, 1613)
The New Prophetical King of Barbary (London: Arthur Jonson, 1613)
The Messiah Alreadie Come, Or Proofs of Christianitie (Amsterdam: Giles Thorp, 1613)
A Short Relation of the Departure of the High and Mighty Prince Frederick King Elect of Bohemia (Dort: George Waters, 1619)
The Reasons which compelled the States of Bohemia to reject the Archduke Ferdinand (Dort: George Waters, 1619)
The Messiah Already Come, Or Proofs of Christianitie (Amsterdam: Giles Thorp, 1619)
Bohemica Jura Defensa: The Bohemian Laws or Rights Defended, Against the Informer (1620)
The Tragical Life and Death of Muley Abdala Melek the late King of Barbarie (Delft, 1633)
A Vindication of the Holy Scriptures, Or the Manifestation of Jesus Christ the True Messiah Already Come (London: J.M., 1656)
Proofs of Christianity: historically setting forth Jesus Christ the true Messiah already come (London: J. Playford, 1658)

See also
 Anglo-Moroccan alliance

Notes

External links

17th century in Morocco
Year of birth missing
Year of death missing
Ambassadors of England to Morocco
17th-century English writers
17th-century English male writers
17th-century English diplomats
English male writers